1968 in sports describes the year's events in world sport.

Alpine skiing
 Alpine Skiing World Cup:
 Men's overall champion: Jean-Claude Killy, France
 Women's overall champion: Nancy Greene, Canada

American football
 Super Bowl II – the Green Bay Packers (NFL) won 33–14 over the Oakland Raiders (AFL)
Location: Miami Orange Bowl
Attendance: 75,546
MVP: Bart Starr, QB (Green Bay)
 Rose Bowl (1967 season):
 The Southern California Trojans won 14–3 over the Indiana Hoosiers to win the college football national championship
 The Cincinnati Bengals were formed
 November 17 – The Oakland Raiders score two consecutive touchdowns in the last minute of the fourth quarter to beat the New York Jets 43–32, in the infamous "Heidi Game".

O. J. Simpson, running back for the USC Trojans, was the overwhelming choice for the Heisman Trophy, with 2,853 points. Second was Leroy Keyes, running back for Purdue, with 1,103 points, followed by Terry Hanratty (QB-Notre Dame), Ted Kwalick (TE-Penn State) and Ted Hendricks (DE-Miami).

Association football
 Brazil – First Division Champions: Botafogo FR 
 England – First Division Champions: Manchester City F.C.
 England – FA Cup – West Bromwich Albion 1–0 Everton
 Scotland – First Division Champions: Celtic F.C.
 Scotland – Cup Winners: Dunfermline Athletic F.C. (defeated Heart of Midlothian 3–1)
 European Championship – Italy beat Yugoslavia 2–0 in a replay. The original final ended 1–1.

Australian rules football
 Victorian Football League
 Carlton wins the 72nd VFL Premiership (Carlton 7.14 (56) d Essendon 8.5 (53))
 Brownlow Medal awarded to Bob Skilton (South Melbourne)

Baseball
 Kansas City Athletics move to Oakland, California to become the Oakland Athletics.
 January 23 – Joe Medwick is voted into the Baseball Hall of Fame. Medwick won the Triple Crown in 1937 and batted .300 in 14 of 17 seasons.
 January 28 – Goose Goslin and Kiki Cuyler are admitted to the Hall of Fame by unanimous vote of the Special Veterans Committee. Goslin was a career .316 hitter who played in four World Series. Cuyler was a .321 career hitter with four stolen base crowns.
 Denny McLain of the Detroit Tigers became the first pitcher in Major League Baseball to win 30 or more games since Dizzy Dean of the St. Louis Cardinals in 1934. Since McLain, no pitcher has accomplished that feat.
 Bob Gibson of the St. Louis Cardinals recorded a 1.12 Earned Run Average, a live-ball era record, as well as the major league record in 300 or more innings pitched.
 World Series – Detroit Tigers won 4 games to 3 over the St. Louis Cardinals. The Series MVP was Mickey Lolich, Detroit.
 June 24 – Jim Northrup of the Detroit Tigers hits grand slams in consecutive at-bats, 5th and 6th innings.

Basketball
 NCAA Men's Basketball Championship –
 UCLA wins 78–55 over North Carolina
 NBA Finals –
 Boston Celtics won 4 games to 2 over the Los Angeles Lakers
 Phoenix Suns, one of National Basketball Association club representative, was founded in Arizona on January 22.

Boxing
 May 8 – Bob Foster knocked out Dick Tiger in the fourth round to win the World Light-Heavyweight Championship.

Canadian football
 Grey Cup – Ottawa Rough Riders won 24–21 over the Calgary Stampeders
 Vanier Cup – Queen's Golden Gaels won 42–14 over the Wilfrid Laurier Golden Hawks

Cricket
 January 31 – Australia secure victory in the Fourth Test match versus India and win the series 4–0
 August 27 – England win the final Test match at The Oval against Australia to tie the series 1–1. Australia retain The Ashes
 August 28 – Basil D'Oliveira is excluded from the MCC  South African tour side leading to turmoil in the world of cricket.

Cycling
 Giro d'Italia won by Eddy Merckx of Belgium
 Tour de France – Jan Janssen of the Netherlands
 UCI Road World Championships – Men's road race – Vittorio Adorni of Italy

Field hockey
 Olympic Games (Men's Competition) in Mexico City, Mexico
 Gold Medal: Pakistan
 Silver Medal: Australia
 Bronze Medal: India
 March 9 – In an international women's field hockey match at Wembley Stadium, England. England beat the Netherlands 1–0.

Figure skating
 World Figure Skating Championships –
 Men's champion: Emmerich Dänzer, Austria
 Ladies' champion: Peggy Fleming, United States
 Pair skating champions: Ludmila Belousova & Oleg Protopopov, Soviet Union
 Ice dancing champions: Diane Towler & Bernard Ford, Great Britain

Golf
Men's professional
 Masters Tournament – Bob Goalby wins after Roberto DeVicenzo makes on a score card error. DeVicenzo writes a 4 instead of the 3 on the 17th hole.
 U.S. Open – Lee Trevino became the first golfer to shoot in the 60s in every round of the U.S. Open.
 British Open – Gary Player
 PGA Championship – Julius Boros
 PGA Tour money leader – Billy Casper – $205,169
Men's amateur
 British Amateur – Michael Bonallack
 U.S. Amateur – Bruce Fleisher
Women's professional
 Women's Western Open – discontinued
 LPGA Championship – Sandra Post became the youngest golfer to ever win an LPGA major tournament by capturing the LPGA Championship.
 U.S. Women's Open – Susie Berning
 Titleholders Championship – not played
 LPGA Tour money leader – Kathy Whitworth – $48,379

Horse racing
Steeplechases
 Cheltenham Gold Cup – Fort Leney
 Grand National – Red Alligator
Flat races
 Australia – Melbourne Cup won by Royal Parma
 Canada – Queen's Plate won by Merger
 France – Prix de l'Arc de Triomphe won by Vaguely Noble
 Ireland – Irish Derby Stakes won by Ribero
 English Triple Crown Races:
 2,000 Guineas Stakes – Sir Ivor
 The Derby – Sir Ivor
 St. Leger Stakes – Ribero
 United States Triple Crown Races:
 Kentucky Derby – Forward Pass
 Preakness Stakes – Forward Pass
 Belmont Stakes – Stage Door Johnny

Ice hockey
 January 15 – death of Bill Masterton, Canadian ice hockey player, as a result of injury sustained during a game
 Art Ross Trophy as the NHL's leading scorer during the regular season: Stan Mikita, Chicago Black Hawks
 Hart Memorial Trophy – for the NHL's Most Valuable Player: Stan Mikita, Chicago Black Hawks
 Stanley Cup – Montreal Canadiens win four games to none over the St. Louis Blues
 World Hockey Championship
 Men's champion: Soviet Union defeated Czechoslovakia
 NCAA Men's Ice Hockey Championship – University of Denver Pioneers defeat University of North Dakota Fighting Sioux 4–0 in Duluth, Minnesota

Motorsport

Rugby league
1968 New Zealand rugby league season
1968 NSWRFL season premiers: South Sydney DRLFC
1967–68 Northern Rugby Football League season / 1968–69 Northern Rugby Football League season
1968 Rugby League World Cup winners: Australia

Rugby union
 74th Five Nations Championship series is won by France who complete the Grand Slam

Snooker
 World Snooker Championship challenge match: John Pulman beats Eddie Charlton 39–34

Swimming
 XIX Olympic Games, held in Mexico City (October 17 – October 26)

Tennis
Australia
 Australian Men's Singles Championship – William Bowrey (Australia) defeats Juan Gisbert, Sr. (Spain) 7–5, 2–6, 9–7, 6–4
 Australian Women's Singles Championship – Billie Jean King (USA) defeats Margaret Smith Court (Australia) 6–1, 6–2
England
 Wimbledon Men's Singles Championship – Rod Laver (Australia) defeats Tony Roche (Australia) 6–3, 6–4, 6–2
 Wimbledon Women's Singles Championship – Billie Jean King (USA) defeats Judy Tegart Dalton (Australia) 9–7, 7–5
France
 French Men's Singles Championship – Ken Rosewall (Australia) defeats Rod Laver  (Australia) 6–3, 6–1, 2–6, 6–2
 French Women's Singles Championship – Nancy Richey (USA) defeats Ann Haydon Jones (Great Britain) 5–7, 6–4, 6–1
USA
 American Men's Singles Championship – Arthur Ashe (USA) defeats Tom Okker (Netherlands) 14–12, 5–7, 6–3, 3–6, 6–3
 American Women's Singles Championship – Virginia Wade (Great Britain) defeats Billie Jean King (USA) 6–4, 6–2
Events
 The "open era" in tennis begins, as all the Grand Slam events open to professionals for the first time
Davis Cup
 1968 Davis Cup –  4–1  at Memorial Drive Tennis Centre (grass) Adelaide, Australia

Multi-sport events
 1968 Winter Olympics takes place in Grenoble, France (Feb 6 - Feb 18)
 Norway wins the most medals (14), and the most gold medals (6)
 1968 Summer Olympics takes place in Mexico City, Mexico (Oct 12 - Oct 27)
 United States wins the most medals (107), and the most gold medals (45)
 Fifth Winter Universiade held in Innsbruck, Austria

Awards
 Associated Press Male Athlete of the Year – Denny McLain, Major League Baseball
 Associated Press Female Athlete of the Year – Peggy Fleming, Figure skating

Births
February 3 – Vlade Divac, Yugoslav and Serbian basketball player
February 5 – David Flores, Mexican jockey
March 22 – Javier Castillejo, Spanish boxer
April 8 – Max Brito, Ivorian rugby union player (died 2022)
April 16 – Martin Dahlin, Swedish footballer
April 19 – Fernando Marroquin, Guatemalan Olympic swimmer
August 6 – Olga Markova, Russian long-distance runner
December 18 – Mark Cooper, English footballer

Deaths
 April 7 - Jim Clark, 32, racecar driver
June 9 – Ronnie Duman, 39, US racecar driver (crashed while competing in the Rex Mays 150) 
September 30 – Johan Nyström, 94, Swedish Olympic athlete

References

 
Sports by year